Jia Yi (c. 200169 BCE) was a Chinese essayist, poet and politician of the Western Han dynasty, best known as one of the earliest known writers of fu rhapsody and for his essay "Disquisition Finding Fault with Qin" (Guò Qín Lùn ), which criticises the Qin dynasty and describes Jia's opinions on the reasons for its collapse. In particular, he is famous for his two fu, On the Owl and his Lament for Qu Yuan. He is also the author of the treatise Xinshu, containing political and educational insights.

Life
Jia Yi's biography is contained in Volume 84 of the Records of the Grand Historian. Jia Yi was born about 200 BCE in Luoyang, though some sources suggest his birth may have been a year earlier in about 201 BCE.  As a youth Jia became well known in his home county for his literary skills and ability to recite the Chinese Classics. His precociousness caught the attention of "Venerable Wu" (Wu gong ), the local governor and a prominent Legalist scholar who had been a student of the Qin dynasty official Li Si.  Wu brought Jia onto his staff, and when he became Commandant of Justice in 179 BCE he recommended Jia to Emperor Wen of Han as a scholar of the Classics. Emperor Wen made Jia a "professor" (bóshì ), and within one year had promoted him to Grand Master of the Palace (tàizhōng dàfū ), a relatively high-ranking position at the imperial court.

Upon assuming his new position, Jia began submitting proposals for institutional reformsincluding a proposal to require vassal lords to actually reside in their fiefs and not at the capital. He advised Wen to teach his heir to use Shen Buhai's administrative method, so as to be able to "supervise the functions of the many officials and understand the usages of government." He was frequently opposed by a group of older officials who had been early supporters of Liu Bang, the founder of the Han dynasty, and who continued to hold important positions under Emperor Wen.  This old-guard faction, probably feeling that Jia was a threat to their own positions, protested when Emperor Wen was considering promoting Jia to a ministerial post, saying that Jia was "young and just beginning his studies, yet he concentrates all his desires on arrogating authority to himself, and has brought chaos and confusion to everything."  The emperor, bowing to the faction's pressure, gradually stopped seeking Jia's advice, and in 176 BCE exiled Jia to the southern Changsha Kingdom (roughly corresponding to modern Hunan Province) to serve as Grand Tutor to its young king Wu Chan (r. 178157 BCE).

Emperor Wen ended Jia's exile around 172 BCE by summoning him back to the imperial capital at Chang'an, ostensibly in order to consult him on matters of Daoist mysticism.  The emperor appointed him to the position of Grand Tutor (tàifù ) to Liu Yi, Emperor Wen's youngest and favorite son, who was said to have been a good student and to have enjoyed reading.  Liu Yi died in 169 BCE due to injuries he suffered in a fall from a horse.  Jia blamed himself for the accident and died, grief-stricken, about one year later.

Works 
Jia known for his famous essay "Disquisition Finding Fault with Qin" (Guò Qín Lùn 過秦論), in which Jia recounts his opinions on the cause of the Qin dynasty's collapse, and for two of his surviving fu rhapsodies: "On the Owl" and "Lament for Qu Yuan". Since he wrote favorably of social and ethical ideas attributed to Confucius and wrote an essay focused on the failings of the Legalist-based Qin Dynasty (221–206 BC), he was classified by other scholars in the Han Dynasty as a Confucian scholar (rujia).  Jia Yi was known for his interest in ghosts, spirits, and other aspects of the afterlife; and, he wrote his Lament to Qu Yuan as a sacrificial offering to Qu Yuan, who had a century-or-so earlier drowned himself after being politically exiled. Jia Yi's actions inspired future exiled poets to a minor literary genre of similarly writing and then tossing their newly composed verses into the Xiang River, or other waters, as they traversed them on the way to their decreed places of exile.

See also

 Chao Cuo
 Fu (poetry)
 Jia Yi's Former Residence
 Qu Yuan
 Ten Crimes of Qin
 Xiaoxiang poetry

References

Citations

Sources 
 Works cited

 
 Di Cosmo, Nicola. (2002). Ancient China and Its Enemies: The Rise of Nomadic Power in East Asian History. Cambridge, England: Cambridge University Press. .

External links
 Xin Shu 新書 at Chinese Notes

200s BC births
169 BC deaths
2nd-century BC Chinese philosophers
2nd-century BC Chinese poets
Chinese Confucianists
Han dynasty essayists
Han dynasty poets
Han dynasty politicians from Henan
Poets from Henan
Politicians from Luoyang
Suicides in the Han dynasty
Writers from Luoyang